The 1987 Eckerd Open was a women's tennis tournament played on outdoor clay courts at the Bardmoor Country Club in Tampa, Florida in the United States and was part of the Category 3 tier of the 1987 Virginia Slims World Championship Series. It was the 15th edition of the tournament and was held from April 27 through May 3, 1987. First-seeded Chris Evert won the singles title and earned $30,500 first-prize money.

Finals

Singles
 Chris Evert defeated  Kate Gompert 6–3, 6–2
 It was Evert's 3rd singles title of the year and the 151st of her career.

Doubles
 Chris Evert /  Wendy Turnbull defeated  Elise Burgin /  Rosalyn Fairbank 6–4, 6–3

References

External links
 ITF tournament edition details
 Tournament draws

Eckerd Open
Eckerd Open
Eckerd Open
20th century in Tampa, Florida
Sports competitions in Tampa, Florida
Eckerd Open
Eckerd Open
Eckerd Open